The St. Mary's Seahawks Sailing Team represents St. Mary's College of Maryland in the intercollegiate sport of sailing. They are members of the Intercollegiate Sailing Association (ICSA), the governing body for collegiate sailing, and compete at the Middle Atlantic Intercollegiate Sailing Association (MAISA). The St. Mary's Seahawks are a powerhouse in college sailing.

National championships 
The team holds 15 National Championships:
Dinghy National Championships (3): 2000, 2002, 2009
Women's Dinghy National Championships (2): 1995, 2007
Team Racing National Championships (5): 1999, 2000, 2004, 2007, 2010
Men's Singlehanded National Championships (2): 2020, 2022
Women's Single-handed National Championships (1): 1998 
Sloop National Championships (2): 1994, 2008

And received the Leonard M. Fowle Trophy in 2000.

Sailors 
Mark Ivey was College Sailor of the Year in 2000 and Adrienne Patterson was Women's College Sailor of the Year in 2007.

Olympians 
Jesse Kirkland, Rodrigo Amado, Scott Steele, Mayumi Roller, Farrah Hall and Paul Stoeken  are olympic sailors from St. Mary's.

World champions 
Anthony Kotoun in J/24 and Melges 32.

References

External links
 Website

St. Mary's
St. Mary's Seahawks sailing